Georges Berthoin (born May 17 , 1925, in Nérac, Lot-et-Garonne) is a French politician and diplomat who served as chief of staff to Jean Monnet from 1952 to 1955. He was made an officer of the Legion of Honour in 2006, and a commander of the Ordre national du Mérite in 2013.

References 

1925 births
Living people
French politicians